Diah Mutiara Sukmawati Sukarnoputri (born 26 October 1951) is the third daughter of Indonesia’s founding president Sukarno and his wife Fatmawati. Sukmawati is the younger sister of former Indonesian president Megawati Sukarnoputri and politician Rachmawati Sukarnoputri.

Education
Sukmawati attended elementary and junior high school at Sekolah Rakyat Cikini in Jakarta, graduating in 1967. In 1969, she graduated from State Senior High School 3 Teladan. She attended the Dance Academy of the Jakarta Arts Education Institute (LPKJ) from 1970-1974. In 2003, she enrolled in international relations at Jakarta’s Bung Karno University.

Political career
In 1998, following the fall of Suharto, she revived the Indonesian National Party (PNI), which was renamed PNI Supeni and competed in Indonesia’s 1999 general election, winning only 0.36% of the vote. Being ineligible to contest future elections because of its poor performance, the party changed its name to PNI Marhaenisme in 2002 and Sukmawati was appointed chairwoman. The party received 0.81% of votes in the 2004 general election, winning just one seat in parliament. In the 2009 election, the party won just 0.3% and lost its only seat.

High school diploma case
The Election Supervisory Board (Bawaslu) reported Sukmawati to the National Police in July 2009, alleging she had falsified her high school diploma when registering as a legislative candidate for the Marhaenism Indonesian National Party. Police in August dropped the case, saying there was a lack of evidence as the school's records had been destroyed by a fire in 2007.

Memoir
In 2011, Sukmawati wrote a memoir about the 15 years she lived at the Merdeka Palace, called Creeping Coup d'Etat Mayjen Suharto (The Creeping Coup d’Etat of Major General Suharto). She believes Suharto and other members of the military conducted a coup against Sukarno by using the Order of March 11, 1966. She said she cannot forgive Suharto for human rights violations that occurred in the aftermath of the coup.

Complaint against Rizieq Shihab
In October 2016, Sukmawati filed a police complaint against radical Muslim cleric Rizieq Shihab, accusing him of insulting Sukarno and Indonesian state ideology Pancasila. Rizieq had allegedly made a speech stating “in Sukarno's Pancasila, God is placed in the ass, whereas according to the Jakarta Charter, God is in the head”. The Jakarta Charter was a proposed preamble to Indonesia’s 1945 Constitution that would have required Muslims to follow Shariah law. Police declared Rizieq a suspect in January 2017. He fled Indonesia in May 2017 when also named a suspect in a pornography case.

Personal life
Sukmawati was married to Prince Sujiwa Kusuma (Mangkunegara IX) of the Mangkenegara royal family of Solo, Central Java. They had three children, and later divorced.

On 26 October 2021, she converted from Islam to Hinduism in a "Sudhi Wadani" Hindu ceremony in Bali. She defined the process as going back to her roots and described being influenced by her grandmother who was a Hindu.

Controversial poem
On 28 March 2018, Sukmawati recited a poem deemed offensive and blasphemous by some Muslims. Amron Ansyhari of Hanura Party and lawyer Denny Andrian Kusdayat on 3 April reported Sukmawati to Jakarta Police for alleged blasphemy. Her poem, Ibu Indonesia (Mother Indonesia) was a celebration of Indonesian fashion and tradition, which she compared to imported Islamic fashion and tradition. Denny, who had in 2012 been jailed for extortion, claimed Sukmawati had belittled God by saying Mother Indonesia's ballad was more soothing than the Islamic call to prayer.

On 4 April, Sukmawati apologized to all Indonesian Muslims, saying she was especially sorry to those who felt offended by the poem. On the same day, another two organizations, the Indonesian Ulema Defense Team (TPUI) and the Indonesian Islamic Student Movement (GMII), reported Sukmawati to police, claiming her poem was an insult. On 6 April, conservative Muslims, including children, protested in Jakarta, demanding Sukmawati be jailed. They said she should not be forgiven for the poem, whereas the Indonesian Ulemas Association and several politicians had called for forgiveness.

References

1951 births
Living people
Sukmawati
Indonesian politicians
Children of national leaders
Indonesian former Muslims
Converts to Hinduism
Converts to Hinduism from Islam
Indonesian Hindus